Nationality words link to articles with information on the nation's poetry or literature (for instance, Irish or France).

Events
Summer – William Wordsworth tours western England and Wales (passing by Tintern Abbey). His first poems are published this year.

Works published

United Kingdom

 William Blake:
 America: A prophecy, illuminated book with 18 relief-etched plates
 For Children, illuminated book with 18 intaglio plates
 Visions of the Daughters of Albion, illuminated book with 11 relief-etched plates
 Lady Sophia Burell, Poems
 Robert Burns, Poems Chiefly in the Scottish Dialect
 Joseph Ritson, The English Anthology, anthology
 Charlotte Smith, The Emigrants, dedicated to William Cowper
 George Thomson, A Select Collection of Original Scottish Airs for the Voice, published in four volumes from this year to 1799; Volume 1 has 59 songs by Robert Burns
 William Wordsworth:
 Descriptive Sketches
 An Evening Walk
 Ann Yearsley, Reflections on the Death of Louis XVI

United States
 Richard Alsop, American Poems
 Ann Eliza Bleecker, The Posthumous Works of Ann Eliza Bleecker, including 36 poems, 23 letters, an unfinished short historical novel, and a captivity narrative (also including Margarette Faugeres's A Collection of Essays, Prose and Poetical), prose and poetry
 Philip Freneau, "On the Anniversary of the Storming of the Bastille", in which the French Revolution is endorsed
 Elihu Hubbard Smith, editor, American Poems, Selected and Original, the first notable American poetry anthology; contains poems largely from the Hartford Wits group of Connecticut poets, including poems by friends of Smith such as John Trumbull, Joel Barlow, Timothy Dwight and Lemuel Hopkins, as well as Philip Freneau, William Livingston, Sarah Wentworth Morton and Robert Treat Paine; Litchfield, Connecticut: Printed by Collier and Buel;

Other
 Solomon Gessner, works, translated into French from the original German of the Swiss poet; in three volumes, published starting 1786, with the last volume published this year; posthumous after 1788

Births
Death years link to the corresponding "[year] in poetry" article:
 June 1 – Henry Francis Lyte (died 1847), Scottish-born Anglican priest and hymn-writer
 July 13 – John Clare (died 1864), English "peasant poet"
 August 25 – John Neal (died 1876), eccentric and influential American writer, critic, lecturer, and activist
 September 25 – Felicia Hemans (died 1835), English poet
 October 11 – Maria James (died 1868), Welsh-born American poet and domestic servant

Deaths
Birth years link to the corresponding "[year] in poetry" article:
 March 29 – Charlotte Brooke (born c. 1740), Irish poet
 July 4 – Antoine-Marin Lemierre (born 1733), French poet and playwright
 September 16 – Johann Adolf Schlegel (born 1721), German poet and pastor

See also

Poetry

Notes

18th-century poetry
Poetry